Donggeochado, Donggeocha Island, or East Geocha Island, is a  island east of Seogeochado in the Geocha Archipelago in South Korea. It is part of the Dadohaehaesang National Park, and the waterway Maenggol Channel. Administratively it is located in Jindo County, South Jeolla Province, in the administrative division of Donggeochado-ri, Jodo-myeon.

On 16 April 2014, the passenger ferry MV Sewol capsized north of the nearby island Byeongpungdo, drifted north while taking in water, and sank off the coast of Donggeochado.

References

External links 
 

Jindo County
Islands of South Jeolla Province
Islands of the Yellow Sea